Côtes-de-Fer is a commune in the Bainet Arrondissement, in the Sud-Est department of Haiti. It has 33,577 inhabitants.

References

Populated places in Sud-Est (department)
Communes of Haiti